Shenzhen Metro Line 1 (formerly branded as Luobao line) runs West–East from  to . Traditionally, it is the most heavily used metro line on the Shenzhen Metro, serving an average of 960,000 people daily in 2014. It has since been surpassed by Line 5, but still averages over 1 million passengers per day as of March 2021.

History

First section
Line 1 was the first metro line built in Shenzhen.

Renaming
On 23 April 2008, the Shenzhen Municipal Planning Bureau renamed Shenzhen Metro Line 1 to 'Luobao line'. The renaming was later reverted in 2013.

North west extension

Timeline

Stations

Rolling stock

Notes

References

Railway lines opened in 2004
Shenzhen Metro lines
Airport rail links in China